Baré can mean:

 The Baré people of Brazil
 The Baré language, spoken by the Barés
 Baré Esporte Clube, a Brazilian football club
 Jeanne Baré, a French explorer
 Ibrahim Baré Maïnassara, a former head of state of Niger
Baré, Cameroon
Baré (footballer), full name Jader Volnei Spindler, Brazilian football player